The 1961–62 Danish 1. division season was the fifth season of ice hockey in Denmark. Four teams participated in the league, and KSF Copenhagen won the championship.

Regular season

External links
Season on eliteprospects.com

Danish
1961 in Danish sport
1962 in Danish sport